, the folk religion of Japan, developed a diversity of schools and sects, outbranching from the original Ko-Shintō (ancient Shintō) since Buddhism was introduced into Japan in the sixth century.

Early period schools and groups
The main Shinto schools with traditions traceable to early periods, according to authoritative published records are:

Bukka Shintō
These were the various forms of Shintō developed by Buddhist thinkers, also known as Bukke Shintō. These doctrines combine Buddhist elements with Shintō elements (Shinbutsu shūgō).

Goryū Shintō
Goryū refers to the Buddhist Dharma lineage. This Shinto schools was part of Ryōbu Shintō.

Hakke Shintō
The Shirakawa Hakuō House, in charge of the post of superintendent of the Department of Divinities (Jingi-kan) transmitted this school. Also called Shirakawa Shintō.

Hokke Shintō
These doctrines were influenced by the Nichiren sect of Buddhism which incorporated kami cults within its own system.

Inbe Shintō
This is the Inbe clan lineage and commonly held to have been created by Inbe Masamichi that was in charge of court rituals together with the Nakatomi clan.

Ise Shintō
Transmitted by priests of the Watarai clan at the Outer Shrine (Gekū) of the Grand Shrine of Ise (Ise Jingū). It is also called Watarai Shintō.

Jingidōke
A collective term for lineages which were mainly occupied with Shinto, these included the jingi clans (jingi shizoku) and clans connected to the Jingi-kan such as the Nakatomi and Inbe.

Jūhachi Shintō
Yoshida Kanetomo, taught his principles in his work Essentials of Prime Shinto (Yuiitsu Shintō myōbō yōshū).

Juka Shintō

Shinto explained by Japanese Confucianists. These teachings claim the unity of Shinto and Confucianism.

Kaden Shintō
The Shinto transmitted by hereditary Shinto priests, known as shinshokuke or shake. It is also called shake Shintō, shaden Shintō or densha Shintō.

Kikke Shintō
Transmitted by the Tachibana clan. Kikke Shinto became widely known during the mid-Edo Hōei era (1704–1710).

Kōshin
Is a folk faith in Japan with Taoist origins, influenced by Shinto, Buddhism and other local beliefs.

Koshintō
"Ancient Shintō". These were the various doctrines and myths of Shintō before the integration of Buddhism elements.

Miwa-ryū Shintō
A form of Ryōbu Shintō that developed primarily at Byōdōji and Ōgorinji (Ōmiwadera), temples serving as the "parish temples" (jingū-ji) of Ōmiwa Shrine in Nara Prefecture.

Mononobe Shintō
Based on the text Sendai kuji hongi taiseikyō.

Ōgimachi Shintō
Originated by Suika Shinto by Ōgimachi Kinmichi's (1653–1733) transmission to the sovereign and court retainers. In 1680 Kinmichi presented a Shinto oath to Yamazaki Ansai, taking up a full-scale study of Suika Shinto.

Reisō Shintō
Buddhist Shintō (Bukka Shintō) created in the Edo period by Chōon Dō kai (1628–1695) and further developed by Jōin (1683–1739).

Ritō Shinchi Shintō
Created by Confucian scholar Hayashi Razan (1583–1657). Razan was the only Confucian scholar officially employed by the Tokugawa government.

Ryōbu Shintō
These are the Shintō doctrines derived from Shingon Buddhism. These doctrines relate the Inner Shrine of Ise with Dainichi of the Womb Realm (taizōkai) and the Outer Shrine with Dainichi of the Vajra realm (kongōkai).

Sannō Shintō
Tendai sect Shintō, based on the cult of the Mountain King (Sannō) at the Hiyoshi Taisha.

Shugendō
Shugendō and its practitioners, shugen, teaches the attainment of supranormal, magico-religious power through ascetic activities in the mountains. It was submissive to Buddhism for some time, later dividing into sects with more or less Buddhist or Koshintō influence.

Suika Shintō
Created by Yamazaki Ansai, a Confucian-Shintoist of the early Edo period.

Taishi-ryū Shintō
Founded by Prince Shōtoku (Shōtoku Taishi, 574–622) and unifying Shintō, Confucianism, and Buddhism (sankyō itchi).

Tsuchimikado Shintō

Created by the head court diviner Tsuchimikado Yasutomi. Yasutomi integrated the astrological and calendrical theories transmitted by the Onmyōdō specialists of the Abe clan.

Tsushima Shintō
Originated at Tsushima Island in the Sea of Japan.

Uden Shintō
Created by Kamo no Norikiyo (a.k.a. Umetsuji no Norikiyo, 1798–1862). Norikiyo developed his teachings on the basis of the Shinto transmissions at the shrine of Kamo wake Ikazuchi Jinja.

Unden Shintō
Founded by Shingon monk Jiun Onkō (1718–1804). It is also known as Katsuragi Shintō because Jiun lived on Mt. Katsuragi. It integrates esoteric Buddhism, siddham (Sanskrit philology), and Zen, as well as Confucianism and Shinto.

Yoshida Shintō
Founded by Yoshida Kanetomo (1435–1511), who called his tradition yuiitsu shintō ("only-one Shintō"). His adherents and Yoshida Shrine, until the end of the Edo period, retained the right to award ranks to all shrines and priests except for a few associated with the Imperial family.

Yoshikawa Shintō
This is a lineage transmitted by Shinto scholar Yoshikawa Koretari (1616–1694).

Present Shinto Sects

Fuso-kyo
One of the thirteen sects of prewar Shintō. It was organized by Shishino Nakaba (1844–84) based on the mountain faith to Mount Fuji (Fuji shinkō) founded by Hasegawa Kakugyō (1541?–1646?).

Izumo Ōyashirokyō
One of the original thirteen pre-war sects of Shinto. It was founded by Senge Takatomi (1845–1918).

Jikkō kyō
One of the thirteen sects of pre-war Shinto. Based on Fujidō, founded by Hasegawa Kakugyō (born in Nagasaki, 1541–1646). A mountain faith focused on Mount Fuji (Fuji shinkō).

Konkōkyō
One of the thirteen sects of prewar Shinto. Founded by Konkō Daijin (1814–83) (born Akazawa Bunji).

Kurozumikyō
One of the thirteen sects of prewar Shinto, founded by Kurozumi Munetada (1780–1850).

Misogikyo
One of the thirteen sects of prewar Shinto. Founded by Inoue Masakane (1790–1849).

Ontakekyō
One of the thirteen sects of Shinto in the prewar period centered on faith in Mount Ontake (ontake shinkō).

Shinrikyo
One of the thirteen sects of prewar Shinto, founded by Sano Tsunehiko (1834–1906).

Shinshūkyō
One of the thirteen sects of prewar Shinto, founded by Yoshimura Masamochi (1839–1915).

Shinto Shusei
One of the thirteen sects of prewar Shinto, founded by Nitta Kuniteru (1829–1902).

Shintō Taikyō
One of the thirteen sects of prewar Shinto, known previously as Shintō Honkyoku (its formal name was simply "Shintō").

Shintō Taiseikyō
One of the thirteen sects of prewar Shintō, founded by Hirayama Seisai (1815–1890).

Shintō-derived religious movements

Ananaikyō

An Ōmoto-lineage religion founded by Nakano Yonosuke (1887–1974).

Chikakusan Minshukyō Kyōdan
Based on the mountain-worship cult of Mount Ontake in the Kiso region founded by Nehashi Umetarō (1868–1922) as the Chikaku Kōsha (Chikaku Religious Association).

Chūshinkai
A movement focused on divination and onomancy, founded by Kumazaki Ken'ō (1881–1961).

Daihizenkyō
Founded by Orimo Nami (1893–1966).

Ennōkyō
Founded by Fukada Chiyoko (1887–1925).

Hachidai Ryūō Daishizen Aishinkyōdan 	
Founded by Ishikawa Sen (1886–1961), who declared to be possessed (kamigakari) by a spirit.

Hachidai Ryūōjin Hakkō Seidan 	
Founded by Demura Ryūsei (1926– ).

Hachirakukai Kyōdan
Founded by Ogawa Kōichirō (1919–80).

Hi no Oshie
Teaching of the Sun. Founded by Sakuma Nikkō (1884–1954) (Nikkō means "sun-light").

Hikari Kyōkai
Derived from Ōmoto. Founded by painter Okamoto Tenmei (1897–1963).

Hizuki no Miya	
Founded by Fujimoto Toshinari (1930–1989). The founding of the religion is dated from January 11, 1956, when Fujimoto received a revelation from the kami Amaterasu ōmikami.

Honbushin	
A group from Tenrikyō lineage. Founded by Ōnishi Tama (1916–1969), the group originated in 1961 within Honmichi as the Tenri Mirokukai (Tenri Miroku Association) and later seceded.

Honmichi
Founded by Ōnishi Aijirō (1881–1958) a teacher in Tenrikyō.

Ijun
Founded by Takayasu Ryūsen (1934–) as an Okinawan religion.

Ishinkyō
Founded by Hashiguchi Reizui (1879–1963).

Izumo Shin’yū Kyōkai	
Founded in 1968 by Hosoya Seiko (1927–) after she had practiced austerities in Izumo, Nara and Eiheiji.

Izumokyō	
This is a religion reminiscent of sectarian Shinto (Kyōha Shintō). It was started by Kitajima Naganori (1834–93).

Jieidō	
Lineage of Sekai Kyūseikyō, founded by Katsunuma Hisako (1927–).

Jingūkyō
With characteristics of sect Shinto (kyōha Shintō) and founded by Urata Nagatami and others.

Kakushin Shūkyō Nipponkyō	
Originated in 1940, when the "Father-deity Kotoshironushi no ōkami" descended upon Chitose Makami (1879–1986).

Kannagarakyō	
Founded by Mizuno Fusa (1883–1970).

Kikueikai Kyōdan
Founded in 1928 by the sculptor of Buddhist images Hayashi Shikō (1901–88). Shikō claimed that a golden sphere with the form of a "nine-star divination pattern" came floating towards him, after which he began to engage in spiritual healing.

Kogi Shintō
Founded by the Shinto priest Kuwabara Yachio (1910–) after World War II.

Koshintō Senpōkyō
Founded by Masai Yoshimitsu (1907–1970), and known for its claim to be related to the tradition of "ancient Shinto" (Koshintō).

	

Kuzuryū Taisha	
Founded by Ōnishi Masajirō (1913–88) after receiving a dream oracle from the deity Benzaiten (Sanskrit Sarasvati) during a dream in 1954.

Kyūseishukyō
Resulting from the merging of four branches of Sekai Kyūseikyō, it began its activities in 1955 after the death of the founder of Sekai Kyūseikyō, Okada Mōkichi (1882–1955).

Makoto no Michi	
Founded by Ogiwara Makoto (1910–81) who experienced paranormal powers since before World War II.

Makoto no Michikyō
Founded by Matsumoto Jōtarō (September 1881–1944).

Maruyamakyō
Founded by Itō Rokurobei (1829–94).

Misogikyō Shinpa
Founded by Sakata Yasuhiro (1962–).

Mitamakyō
Founded by Nagata Fuku (1891–1975).

Miyaji Shinsendō
Founded by Miyaji Suii (known as Kakiwa, 1852–1904) and with strong Taoist influence.

Nihon Jingū Honchō
Founded by Nakajima Shūkō (1902–88) who was deeply interested in the study of the traditional calendar (rekigaku) and the theory of five phases of matter (gogyō).

Nihon Seidō Kyōdan
Founded by Iwasaki Shōō (1934–) who had a mystical experience while in a coma.

Nikkōkyō
Founded by Teraguchi Kōjirō (1881–1960).

Ōkanmichi
Founded by Yamada Baijirō (1875–1941), a Tenrikyō teacher.

Ōmiwakyō (Sako)
Founded by Sako Kan (1878–1937).

Ōmiwakyō　(Kojima)
Founded by Kojima Moriyoshi in 1872.

Ōmoto
Founded by Deguchi Nao (1836–1918) and Deguchi Onisaburō (1871–1948) after a "spirit dream" at the lunar New Year in 1892.

Ōmoto Hikari no Michi
Founded by Hōkan Meikyō (1923–) based on Ōmoto and Sekai Kyūseikyō.

Ōyamanezu no Mikoto Shinji Kyōkai
Founded by Inai Sadao (1906–88).

Perfect Liberty Kyōdan (PL Kyōdan)
Known as Church of Perfect Liberty frequently abbreviated as merely "PL", founded by Miki Tokuharu (1871–1938), a Zen monk.

Reiha no Hikari Kyōkai
Founded by Hase Yoshio (1915–84).

Renmonkyō
Founded by Shimamura Mitsu (1831–1904) who was saved from serious illness by Yanagita Ichibei, who had studied the "marvelous law of things" (myōhō no ji).

Renshindō Kyōdan
Founded by Tanaka Jigohei (1886–1973).

Samuhara Jinja
Started in 1935 when Tanaka Tomisaburō (1868–1967) rebuilt a dilapidated shrine in Okayama.

Seichō no Ie
Connected to Ōmoto and founded by Taniguchi Masaharu (1893–1985).

Seikōkyō
Founded by Fujita Nobuhiko (1889–1977).

Seimeikyō
Derived from Sekai Kyūseikyō and created in 1955 by Kihara Yoshihiko.

Seishin Myōjōkai
Founded by Fujita Motonari (1903–85).

Sekai Kyūseikyō
Church of World Messianity from the Ōmoto lineage. It was founded by Okada Mokichi.

Sekai Mahikari Bunmei Kyōdan
Derivation from Ōmoto and Sekai Kyūseikyō, founded by Okada Kōtama (1901–1974, born Yoshikazu).

Sekai Shindōkyō
Founded by Aida Hide (1898–1973).

Shidaidō
Founded by Nagahashi Yasuhiko (1895–1981) in 1931.

Shin Nihon Shūkyō Dantai Rengōkai
Federation of New Religious Organizations of Japan, founded by and for new Japanese religious movements. Established in 1951 with a membership of twenty-four groups.

Shindō Tenkōkyo
Founded by Tomokiyo Yoshizane (1888–1952).

Shinji Shūmeikai
Founded by Koyama Mihoko (1910–).

Shinmei Aishinkai
Founded by Komatsu Shin'yō (1928– ).

Shinreikai Kyōdan
Founded by Ishii Reizan (born Iwayoshi, 1884–58) who had a revelation in 1932.

Shinreikyō
Founded by Ōtsuka Kan'ichi (1891–72).

Shinri Jikkō no Oshie
Founded by Honjō Chiyoko (1902–1957).

Shinsei Tengan Manaita no Kai
Founded by Kurata Chikyū (1906–91).

Shintō Shinkyō
Founded by Unigame Ito (1876–1976).

Shintō Shinshinkyō
Founded by Adachi Taijūrō (1841–1895) who received a divine revelation after nine years of his own unique form of practice.

Shizensha
Founded by Hashimoto Satomi (1899–1984).

Shōroku Shintō Yamatoyama
Founded by Tazawa Seishirō (1884–1966) after dedicating a shrine to a "mountain kami" (yama no kami) in 1919, witnessing extraordinary astronomical phenomena, and hearing divine voices.

Shūkyō Hōjin Byakkō Shinkōkai
Founded by Goi Masahisa (1916–1980) emphasizes two characteristic Ōmoto doctrines, the notion that all religions emanate from the same root (bankyō dōkon), and the principle of world peace.

Shūkyō Hōjin Shikō Gakuen
Founded by Kawakami Seizan (1908–51).

Shūyōdan Hōseikai
Founded by Idei Seitarō (1899–1983).

Soshindō
Started focused on Matsushita Matsuzō (1873–1947), a spirit medium (reinōsha) active from the Taisho era (1912–26) to the World War II period.

Soshindō Kyōdan
Founded by Yoshioka Tajūrō (1905–87).

Subikari Kōha Sekai Shindan
Founded by the spiritualist manga artist Kuroda Minoru (1928– ).

Sukui no Hikari Kyōdan
A new religion deriving from Sekai Kyūseikyō, one several groups in opposition to that religion's policy of centralization (ichigenka) implemented in the mid-1960s.

Sūkyō Mahikari
Derived from the lineages of Ōmoto and Sekai Kyūseikyō, founded by Kōtama Okada (Sukuinushisama) (1901–74) on August 28, 1959 and established as a registered religious organisation on 1978 by Mr Okada's daughter Sachiko Keishu Okada (Oshienushisama), (1929– ).

Sumerakyō
Founded by Onikura Taruhiko after having experienced possession (kamigakari) by a deity around 1919.

Taireidō
Founded by Tanaka Morihei (1884–1928) who was said to have acquired a kind of supranormal power (reishiryoku) after a four-month ascetic seclusion in the mountains.

Taiwa Kyōdan
Emerged from Yamatokyō, founded by Hozumi Kenkō (1913–76) and his wife Hisako (1908–2003).

Tamamitsu Jinja
Founded by the spirit medium Motoyama Kinue (1909–74).

Ten'onkyo
Founded by Hachiro Fukuji (1899–1962) who experienced the ability to converse with a spirit, and thereafter received visitations from various deities.

Tenchikyō
Founded by Uozumi Masanobu (1852–1928).

Tengenkyō
Founded by Naniwa Hisakazu (1902–84).

Tenjōkyō
Founded by Ishiguro Jō (1908– ).

Tenjōkyō Hon'in
Founded by Kuramoto Ito (1895–1985).

Tenkōkyō
Founded by Fujita Shinshō (?–1966) who received at age nineteen a revelation from a deity he called Tenchikane no kami ("heaven-earth gold deity").

Tenrikyō
It was one of the thirteen sects of prewar Shinto. Founded by Nakayama Miki (1798–1887) after having a sudden experience of spirit possession (kamigakari)from a deity she called Tenri-O-no-Mikoto. in the tenth lunar month of 1863. Tenrikyo removed itself from its Sect Shinto classification when it was free to do so after World War II.

Tensei Shinbikai
Founded by Iwanaga Kayoko (1934–).

Tensenku Monkyō (Tendan)
Known locally as Tinsinkun Munchu (Tinkha), emerged from ancient Shintō (Koshintō) in the southern Ryukyu islands.

Tensha Tsuchimikado Shintō Honchō
Inspired in Tsuchimikado Shintō (Tensha Shintō).

Tenshin Seikyō
Founded by Shimada Seiichi (1896–1985).

Tenshindō Kyōdan
Founded by Tamura Reishō (1890–1968) who received the revelation of Kami on April 3, 1927.  While working in the office of the Governor-General of Korea, Reishō studied the Daoistic magical arts transmitted in Korea since ancient times.

Tenshinkyō Shin'yūden Kyōkai
Founded by Kamiide Fusae (1922–1980) who had a sudden experience of spirit possession (kamigakari) in 1958.

Tenshō Kōtai Jingūkyō
Founded by Kitamura Sayo (1900–1967).

Tenshōkyō
Founded by Senba Hideo (1925–) and his wife Senba Kimiko.

Tenshūkyō
Founded by Unagami Haruho (1896–1965).

Tokumitsukyō
Founded by Kanada Tokumitsu (1863–1919).

Worldmate (formerly Cosmomate)
Founded by Fukami Seizan (aka Fukami Tōshū, born Haruhisa Handa) (1951–).

Yamakage Shintō
Emerged from "ancient Shinto" (Koshintō) tradition, founded by the Yamakage family.

Yamatokyō
Founded by Hozumi Kenkō (1913–76), a practitioner of Shugendō at Dewa Sanzan.

Zenrinkyō
Founded by Rikihisa Tatsusai (1906–77).

Other sects and schools
There may be some Shinto schools and sects, that even having a structure and followers, are not included in authoritative publications. This may be because of their small size and influence, fairly unknown presence or practices, or because those schools are new branches from older schools and still considered within their structure.

Notes

References
 Breen, John and Mark Teeuwen. (2000).  Shinto in History: Ways of the Kami. Honolulu: University of Hawaii Press. .
 Encyclopedia of New Religions, Shinshūkyō jiten. Inoue Nobutaka et al., eds., Kōbundō, 1990. 
 Encyclopedia of Shinto, Schools, Groups and Personalities. Institute of Japanese Culture and Classics, Kokugakuin University (2006) Edit Norman Havens 
 Religions Yearbook, Agency for Cultural Affairs, Shūkyō nenkan (1993), eds Japan Monbushō, Japan Bunkachō. ISSN 0583-1571

Sects
Religious denominations